A mastodon ( 'breast' +  'tooth') is any proboscidean belonging to the extinct genus Mammut. Mastodons inhabited North and Central America from the late Miocene up to their extinction at the end of the Pleistocene 10,000 to 11,000 years ago.

Mastodons are the most recent members of the family Mammutidae, which diverged from the ancestors of elephants over 20 million years ago.

M. americanum, the American mastodon, and M. pacificus, the Pacific mastodon, are the youngest and best-known species of the genus. They lived in herds and were predominantly forest-dwelling animals. M. americanum is inferred to have had a browsing diet with a preference for woody material, distinct from that of the contemporary Columbian mammoth. Mastodons became extinct as part of the Quaternary extinction event that exterminated most Pleistocene megafauna present in the Americas, believed to have been caused by a combination of climate changes at the end of the Pleistocene and hunting by recently arrived Paleo-Indians, as evidenced by a number of kill sites where mastodon remains are associated with human artifacts.

History
 
The mystery animal became known as the "incognitum". In 1739 French soldiers at present-day Big Bone Lick State Park, Kentucky, found the first bones to be collected and studied scientifically. They carried them to the Mississippi River, from where they were transported to the National Museum of Natural History in Paris. Similar teeth were found in South Carolina, and some of the African slaves there supposedly recognized them as being similar to the teeth of African elephants. There soon followed discoveries of complete bones and tusks in Ohio. People started referring to the "incognitum" as a "mammoth", like the ones that were being dug out in Siberia – in 1796 the French anatomist Georges Cuvier proposed the radical idea that mammoths were not simply elephant bones that had been somehow transported north, but a species which no longer existed. Johann Friedrich Blumenbach assigned the scientific name Mammut to the American "incognitum" remains in 1799, under the assumption that they belonged to mammoths. Other anatomists noted that the teeth of mammoths and elephants differed from those of the "incognitum", which possessed rows of large conical cusps, indicating that they were dealing with a distinct species. In 1817 Cuvier named the "incognitum" Mastodon.

Cuvier assigned the name mastodon (or mastodont) – meaning "breast tooth" (Ancient Greek: μαστός "breast" and ὀδούς, "tooth"), – for the nipple-like projections on the crowns of the molars.

Taxonomy
Mastodon as a genus name is obsolete; the valid name is Mammut, as that name preceded Cuvier's description, making Mastodon a junior synonym. The change was met with resistance, and authors sometimes applied "Mastodon" as an informal name;  consequently it became the common term for members of the genus. "Mastodon" is also used informally to describe other non-elephant proboscideans, such as gomphotheres.

Species include:

 M. americanum, the American mastodon, is one of the best known and among the last species of Mammut. Its earliest occurrences date from the early-middle Pliocene (early Blancan stage). It was formerly regarded (see below) as having a continent-wide distribution, especially during the Pleistocene epoch, known from fossil sites ranging from present-day Alaska, Ontario and New England in the north, to Florida, and as far south as Honduras. Environmental DNA also suggests they ranged as far northeast as Greenland during the warmer conditions of the early Pleistocene. It had tusks that sometimes exceeded  in length; they curved upwards, but less dramatically than those of the woolly mammoth. Its main habitat was cold spruce woodlands, and it is believed to have browsed in herds. It became extinct at the end of the Pleistocene approximately 11,000 years ago.
 M. matthewi — found in the Snake Creek Formation of Nebraska, dating to the late Hemphillian (Late Miocene-Early Pliocene). Some authors consider it practically indistinguishable from M. americanum.
 M. pacificus — based on a 2019 analysis, Pleistocene specimens from California and southern Idaho have been transferred from M. americanum to this new species. It differs from the eastern population in having narrower molars, six as opposed to five sacral vertebrae, a thicker femur, and a consistent absence of mandibular tusks.
 M. raki — Its remains were found in the Palomas Formation, near Truth or Consequences, New Mexico, dating from the early-middle Pliocene, between 4.5 and 3.6 Ma. It coexisted with Equus simplicidens and Gigantocamelus and differs from M. americanum in having a relatively longer and narrower third molar, similar to the description of the defunct genus Pliomastodon, which supports its arrangement as an early species of Mammut. However, like M. matthewi, some authors do not consider it sufficiently distinct from M. americanum to warrant its own species.
 M. cosoensis — found in the Coso Formation of California, dating to the Late Pliocene, originally a species of Pliomastodon, it was later assigned to Mammut.
 M. furlongi, known from a partial mandible with three preserved molars (m1-m3) and a referred m3 from the Clarendonian of Oregon, originally placed in Pliomastodon.
 M. nevadanus originally placed in Pliomastodon, based on a partial cranium with preserved molars and a right tusk from Thousand Creek beds of Humboldt County, Nevada, dating to the Late Miocene-Early Pliocene (Hemphillian) unlike M. americanum, the tusk cuves downwards.

Evolution

Mammut is a genus of the extinct  proboscidean family Mammutidae, related to the family Elephantidae (mammoths and elephants), from which it originally diverged approximately twenty-seven million years ago. The following cladogram shows the placement of the American mastodon among other proboscideans, based on hyoid characteristics:

Mammut is thought to have evolved from a population of Zygolophodon that migrated into North America during the late early Miocene. Some Eurasian mammutid species have been attributed to Mammut, such as the Late Miocene-earliest Pleistocene species "Mammut" borsoni. However, their attribution to the genus has been regarded as questionable, as they are thought to have evolved from mammutids that remained in Eurasia, rather than descending from North American Mammut.

A complete mitochondrial DNA (mtDNA) sequence has been obtained from the tooth of an M. americanum skeleton found in permafrost in northern Alaska. The remains are thought to be 50,000 to 130,000 years old. This sequence has been used as an outgroup to refine divergence dates in the evolution of the Elephantidae. The rate of mtDNA sequence change in proboscideans was found to be significantly lower than in primates.

A 2020 analysis of mtDNA from American mastodon remains collected in eastern Beringia indicated they belonged to two genetically divergent clades. The clades were dated to different interglacials, suggesting a repeating pattern of colonization during an interglacial followed by extirpation during the subsequent glacial advance. The Beringian clades had less genetic diversity than populations present south of the ice sheets, suggesting they were founded by relatively small migrating populations.

Description

Modern reconstructions based on partial and skeletal remains reveal that mastodons were very similar in appearance to elephants and, to a lesser degree, mammoths, though not closely related to either one. Compared to mammoths and extant elephants, mastodons had a longer and wider body but were not as tall due to their shorter legs. Their limbs were more heavily muscled and had considerably thicker limb bones, making mastodons much more robust in comparison. As in modern elephants, the females were smaller than the males.

They had a low and long skull with long curved tusks, with those of the males being more massive and more strongly curved. Mastodons had cusp-shaped teeth, very different from mammoth and elephant teeth (which have a series of enamel plates), well-suited for chewing leaves and branches of trees and shrubs.

Mastodons are typically depicted with a thick woolly mammoth-like coat of hair, but there is no preserved evidence for this, and consideration of the long tail (usually present in animals living in warm climates), size, body mass and environment implies the animal was not similarly hairy, and there is scant preserved evidence of body hair.

Paleobiology

Social behavior

Based on the characteristics of mastodon bone sites and strontium and oxygen isotopes from tusks, it can be inferred that, as in modern proboscideans, the mastodon social group consisted of adult females and young, living in bonded groups called mixed herds. The males abandoned the mixed herds once reaching sexual maturity and lived either alone or in male bond groupings. As in modern elephants, there probably was no seasonal synchrony of mating activity, with both males and females seeking out each other for mating when sexually active.

Diet
Mastodons have been characterized as predominantly browsing animals. Of New World proboscids, they appear to have been the most consistent in browsing rather than grazing, consuming C3 as opposed to C4 plants, and in occupying closed forests versus more open habitats. This dietary inflexibility may have prevented them from invading South America during the Great American Interchange, due to the need to cross areas of grassland to do so. Most accounts of gut contents have identified coniferous twigs as the dominant element in their diet. Other accounts (e.g., the Burning Tree mastodon) have reported no coniferous content and suggest selective feeding on low, herbaceous vegetation, implying a mixed browsing and grazing diet, with evidence provided by studies of isotopic bone chemistry indicating a seasonal preference for browsing. Study of mastodon teeth microwear patterns indicates that mastodons could adjust their diet according to the ecosystem, with regionally specific feeding patterns corresponding to boreal forest versus cypress swamps, while a population at a given location was sometimes able to maintain its dietary niche through changes in climate and browse species availability.

Distribution and habitat

The range of most species of Mammut is unknown as their occurrences are restricted to few localities, the exception being the American mastodon (M. americanum), which is one of the most widely distributed Pleistocene proboscideans in North America. M. americanum fossil sites range in time from the Blancan to Rancholabrean faunal stages and in locations from as far north as Alaska, as far east as Florida, and as far south as the state of Puebla in central Mexico, with an isolated record from Honduras, probably reflecting the results of the maximum expansion achieved by the American mastodon during the Late Pleistocene. A few isolated reports tell of mastodons being found along the east coast up to the New England region, with high concentrations in the Mid-Atlantic region. There is strong evidence indicating that the members of Mammut were forest dwelling proboscideans, predominating in woodlands and forests, and browsed on trees and shrubs. They apparently did not disperse southward to South America, it being speculated that this was because of a dietary specialization on a particular type of vegetation.

A 2022 study of ancient (Early Pleistocene, 2 million years ago) environmental DNA from the Kap Kobenhavn Formation of northern Greenland identified preserved DNA fragments of mastodons, assigned to M. americanum. This suggests that mastodons ranged as far north as Greenland during optimal conditions. Around this time,  northern Greenland was 11–19 °C warmer than the Holocene, with a boreal forest hosting a species assemblage with no modern analogue. These are among the oldest DNA fragments ever sequenced.

Extinction
Fossil evidence indicates that mastodons probably disappeared from North America about 10,500 years ago as part of a mass extinction of most of the Pleistocene megafauna that is widely believed to have been a result of human hunting pressure. The latest Paleo-Indians entered the Americas and expanded to relatively large numbers 13,000 years ago, and their hunting may have caused a gradual attrition of the mastodon population. Analysis of tusks of mastodons from the American Great Lakes region over a span of several thousand years prior to their extinction in the area shows a trend of declining age at maturation; this is contrary to what one would expect if they were experiencing stresses from an unfavorable environment, but is consistent with a reduction in intraspecific competition that would result from a population being reduced by human hunting.

On the other hand, environmental DNA sequencing indicates that disappearance of megafaunal DNA in North America correlates in time with major changes in plant DNA, suggesting a key role of climate change. Modeling based on the whole of the proboscid fossil record also suggests climate was the more important factor, though with human hunting imposing a "double jeopardy" on mastodons and their kin.

See also

Coats–Hines site
List of museums and colleges with mastodon fossils on display
Manis Mastodon site
Snowmastodon site

Notes

References

External links

 The Rochester Museum of Science – Expedition Earth Glaciers & Giants 
 Illinois State Museum – Mastodon
 Calvin College Mastodon Page
 American Museum of Natural History – Warren Mastodon
 BBC Science and Nature:Animals – American mastodon Mammut americanum
 BBC News – Greek mastodon find 'spectacular'
 Missouri State Parks and Historic Sites – Mastodon State Historic Site
 Saint Louis Front Page – Mastodon State Historic Site
 Story of the Randolph Mastodon (Earlham College) 
 The Florida Museum of Natural History Virtual Exhibit – The Aucilla River Prehistory Project:When The First Floridians Met The Last Mastodons
 Western Center for Archaeology & Paleontology, home of the largest mastodon ever found in the Western United States
 Smithsonian Magazine Features Mammoths and Mastodons
 360 View of a Mastodon Skull from Indiana State Museum
 3-D Viewers of male and female mastodon skeletons at the University of Michigan Mammutidae digital fossil repository
Scientific American, "The Chicago Mastodon", 18 September 1880, p. 175

 
Messinian first appearances
Miocene proboscideans
Pleistocene extinctions
Pleistocene proboscideans
Pliocene proboscideans
Miocene mammals of North America
Pliocene mammals of North America
Pleistocene mammals of North America
Symbols of Indiana
Symbols of Michigan
Extinct animals of Canada
Paleontology in Michigan
Taxa named by Johann Friedrich Blumenbach
Ringold Formation Miocene Fauna